Arciszewski is a surname. Notable people with the surname include:

Krzysztof Arciszewski (1592–1656), Polish–Lithuanian nobleman, military officer, engineer, and ethnographer
Tomasz Arciszewski (1877–1955), Polish socialist politician

Polish-language surnames